The Government of National Stability is a Libyan provisional government based in Sirte formed on 3 March 2022, led by Fathi Bashagha and supported by the House of Representatives and the Libyan National Army. Since its inception, the government has claimed power over Libya in competition with the Government of National Unity led by Abdul Hamid Dbeibeh, with Libyan Political Dialogue Forum corresponding with ceasefire agreement.

Background 
On 21 September 2021, The House of Representatives (HoR), which rules eastern Libya, passed a no-confidence motion against the Government of National Unity.

Creation
On 10 February 2022, the House of Representatives selected Fathi Bashagha as prime minister-designate, after HoR Speaker Aguila Saleh Issa announced the only other candidate, Khalid Al-Baybas, withdrew his candidacy. However, Al-Baybas has denied withdrawing from the race. Prime Minister of the Government of National Unity Abdul Hamid Dbeibeh rejected Bashagha's appointment as prime minister, stating that he will only hand power after a national election. LNA leader Khalifa Haftar welcomed Bashagha's appointment.

On 1 March, the House of Representatives voted to give confidence to Bashagha's Government of National Stability. According to HoR Speaker Saleh, 92 out of 101 attending members voted for the new government. The High Council of State rejected "unilateral" steps by the HoR and regards the HoR decision to grant confidence to a new government a violation of the Libyan Political Agreement. The Government of National Unity refused to transfer powers to the Bashagha government. The United Nations has voiced concerns over the vote due to reports on lack of transparency and procedure, and acts of intimidation prior to the HoR session.

Bashagha and his cabinet were sworn in at the headquarters of the House of Representatives in Tobruk on 3 March.

Since mid 2022
In mid-2022, the two governments functioned in parallel, holding dual power.

There were clashes between supporters of the two governments starting in May 2022, which escalated on 27 August 2022.

References 

Government of Libya
Politics of Libya
Current governments